

The Allied Aviation XLRA was a prototype flying-boat transport glider built for the US Navy during World War II. It was a low-wing wooden monoplane that could carry ten troops. Two prototypes were constructed, but orders for 100 production examples were cancelled when the Navy decided to opt for powered transport aircraft instead. The designation LR2A was assigned to a refined version of the design, but this was never produced.

Specifications (XLRA-1)

See also

References

External links

 daveswarbirds.com

LR1A
1940s United States military transport aircraft
Flying boats
1940s United States military gliders
Low-wing aircraft
Cancelled military aircraft projects of the United States
Aircraft first flown in 1943